Cecil Rhode Mountain is a  mountain summit located in the Kenai Mountains, on the Kenai Peninsula in the state of Alaska. This peak is shown on maps as Cooper Benchmark, the northernmost peak on a ridge which includes Stetson Benchmark (4,576-ft), and Peak 4593. The mountain was named for Cecil E. Rhode (1902–1979), director of the Izaak Walton League, wildlife photographer, and writer who lived in Cooper Landing for 42 years and was best known for bringing wide exposure to the public about the wilds of Alaska, particularly in magazines such as National Geographic, Sports Afield, and Outdoor Life. The mountain's toponym was officially adopted August 13, 1981, by the United States Board on Geographic Names. Precipitation runoff from the mountain drains into the Kenai River.

Climate

Based on the Köppen climate classification, Cecil Rhode Mountain is located in a subarctic climate zone with long, cold, snowy winters, and mild summers. Winter temperatures can drop below −20 °C with wind chill factors below −30 °C. This climate supports a spruce and hemlock forest on the lower slopes.

See also

List of mountain peaks of Alaska
Geology of Alaska

References

External links
 Cecil Rhode Mountain Weather forecast
 Flickr photo
 Flickr photo

Mountains of Alaska
Mountains of Kenai Peninsula Borough, Alaska
Kenai Mountains-Turnagain Arm National Heritage Area
North American 1000 m summits